Paramordellaria is a genus of tumbling flower beetles in the family Mordellidae. There are at least two described species in Paramordellaria.

Joel Hallan's Biology Catalog, no longer online, shows Paramordellaria ivoirensis as the only species of Paramordellaria. GBIF, ITIS, and Catalogue of Life list the two species P. carinata and P. triloba but not P. ivoirensis.

Species
These species belong to the genus Paramordellaria:
 Paramordellaria carinata (Smith, 1883) i c g b
 Paramordellaria ivoirensis Ermisch, 1968 doubtful
 Paramordellaria triloba (Say, 1824) i c g b
Data sources: i = ITIS, c = Catalogue of Life, g = GBIF, b = Bugguide.net

References

Further reading

External links

 

Mordellidae